Vanja Dukic is an expert in computational statistics and mathematical epidemiology who works as a professor of applied mathematics at the University of Colorado Boulder. Her research includes work on using internet search engine access patterns to track diseases, and on the effects of climate change on the spread of diseases.

Dukic earned a bachelor's degree in finance and actuarial mathematics from Bryant University in 1995.
She completed her doctorate at Brown University in 2001, under the joint supervision of biostatisticians Constantine Gatsonis and  Joseph Hogan. She worked as a faculty member in the biostatistics program of the Department of Public Health Sciences at the University of Chicago from 2001 to 2010, before moving to Colorado.

In 2015 she was elected as a Fellow of the American Statistical Association "for important contributions to Bayesian modeling of complex processes and analysis of Big Data, substantive and collaborative research in infectious diseases and climate change, and service to the profession, including excellence in editorial work."

References

External links

Year of birth missing (living people)
Living people
21st-century American mathematicians
American women mathematicians
American statisticians
Women statisticians
Biostatisticians
Bryant University alumni
Brown University alumni
University of Chicago faculty
University of Colorado Boulder faculty
Fellows of the American Statistical Association
21st-century women mathematicians
21st-century American women